Fabian Derrick Ssubi Kizito (born 26 July 1990) is an Ugandan international footballer who plays as a forward.

Career
Born in Kampala, Kizito has played club football in the Netherlands for DOTO Pernis, RKSV Leonidas, DCV Krimpen, Veensche Boys, BVCB Bergschenhoek and VV Hillegersberg. In August 2019 he signed for Swedish club Nyköpings BIS.

He earned two caps for Uganda in 2012, scoring one goal. His goal came on his debut in a friendly game against Egypt. His second game was a FIFA World Cup qualifying match against Angola.

References

1990 births
Living people
Ugandan footballers
Uganda international footballers
RKSV Leonidas players
Nyköpings BIS players
Ettan Fotboll players
Association football forwards
Ugandan expatriate footballers
Ugandan expatriates in the Netherlands
Expatriate footballers in the Netherlands
Ugandan expatriate sportspeople in Sweden
Expatriate footballers in Sweden
Sportspeople from Kampala